Coates is an English and Scottish surname.

Origins 
One origin is a locational name from any of several places in England, such as Coates in Cambridgeshire or Cotes in Leicestershire. There is also a locational name which was usually given to the lord of the manor at that place or to someone who moved from there to another village. The derivation is from the Old English pre 7th century cot or cote, meaning cottage or shelter.

Alternatively, Coates is a noble family of English and Scottish origin. The surname Coates, which originally is of Norman background, was first found in Staffordshire where the family are "descended from Sir Richard de Cotes, who was probably son of Thomas de Coates, living in 1157, when the Black Book of the Exchequer was compiled.  At that time, he held large estates on the Salop, Staffordshire borders."

The name was written in early records as De Cote; the letter "a" occurs in the spelling as early as 1331, when in the fourth year of the reign of Edward III, William De Coates was Lord of Coles De Ville in Leicestershire and in 1347 John De Coates held lands in Lincolnshire. By 1273, the name was scattered throughout England as seen in the Hundredorum Rolls of that year: Egidius de Cotes, Norfolk; Robert de Cotes, Buckinghamshire; and Geoffrey de Cotes, Lincolnshire. Later, the Yorkshire Poll Tax Rolls of 1379 listed Thomas del Cotes; Johannes del Cotes; and Henricus del Cote as holding lands. The first Coates family arrived in Ireland in the early 1700s and bought land in Kildare around Donadea, Kilcock and Ovidstown from the Aylmer family, where they built their family estate at Knockanally. The first mention of the name in America is in 1638, when Sir John Coates came to Maryland and soon afterwards obtained the grant of a tract of land five miles from the city of Washington, part of which is still owned by descendants.

Families

Bernard Burke's book Burke's Landed Gentry discusses one branch of this family: Coates of Combe House. It begins with a mention of Edward Coates, Esquire of Combe House in county Radnor who was Justice of the Peace and High Sheriff in 1866. This Coates Family Arms is blazoned as follows in heraldry: Gules, a greyhound statant within an orle of roses argent, with the crest being: Upon a mount vert a greyhound couchant argent collared and lined or, resting the dexter paw on a rose gules. Burke's other book, Burke's Peerage, discusses two branches of this family: Coates of Haypark and Milnes-Coates of Helperby Hall. The first begins with a mention of Sir Frederick Gregory Lindsay Coates, the 2nd Baronet, of Haypark, of the city of Belfast, who was a Major in the Royal Tank Regiment in World War II.

Coates baronets, of Haypark, Belfast
Milnes Coates baronets (formerly the Coates baronets), of Helperby Hall in Yorkshire

A–G

Albert Coates (musician) (1882–1953), English conductor and composer
Sir Albert Coates (surgeon) (1895–1977), Australian surgeon and soldier
Ann Coates (derived from Ancoats), credited name for British singer Morrissey
Anne V. Coates (1926–2018), British-born American film editor
Arnold Coates (1936–2013), English amateur footballer active in the 1960s
Benjamin M. Coates (1819–1880), American politician and businessman
Ben Coates (born 1969), American football player and coach
Clarence L. "Ben" Coates, American computer scientist
Colin Coates (born 1946), Australian ice speed skater
Delman Coates (born 1973), American pastor
Derek Coates (born 1972), English rugby union player
Sir Edward Coates, 1st Baronet (1853–1921), British politician and sportsman
Elaine J. Coates (born 1937), first African American graduate of the University of Maryland
Eric Coates (1886–1957), English composer
Florence Van Leer Earle Coates (1850–1927), American poet and philanthropist
Fred Coates (1879–1956), English footballer
Geoffrey E. Coates (1917–2013), English chemist and academic
Geoffrey W. Coates (born 1966), American chemist and academic
Gloria Coates (born 1938), American composer
Gordon Coates (1878–1943), Prime Minister of New Zealand
Gregory Coates (born 1961), American artist

J–R

James Coates (parliamentary official) (1815–1854), prominent pioneer settler of Auckland and parliamentary official
 Sir James Coates (banker) (1851–1935), New Zealand banker
James Henry Coates (1829–1902), American Civil War regimental commander
Jefferson Coates (1843–1880), American soldier, Medal of Honor recipient
Jim Coates (1932–2019), Major League Baseball pitcher
John Coates (businessman) (born 1970), English businessman and vice-chairman of Stoke City F.C.
John Coates (general) (1932–2018), Lieutenant General Henry John Coates (Australia)
John Coates (naval architect) (1922–2010), English naval architect
John Coates (tenor) (1865–1941), English operatic tenor
John Dowling Coates (born 1949), Australian lawyer, sports administrator and businessman
John H. Coates (1945–2022), Australian mathematician and Sadleirian Professor of Pure Mathematics at the University of Cambridge
Joseph R. T. Coates (died s1921), American politician
Kim Coates (born 1959), Canadian actor
Lorene T. Coates (born 1936), member of the North Carolina General Assembly
Matt Coates (born 1991), Canadian football player
Melissa Coates (1971–2021), female bodybuilder and professional wrestler
Natasha Coates (born ), British disabled gymnast
Nigel Coates (admiral) (1959–2010), a naval officer in the Royal Australian Navy
Odia Coates (1942–1991), American musician
Paul Coates (publisher) (born 1946), American publisher, printer and community activist 
Peter Coates (born 1938), English businessman and chairman of Stoke City F.C.
Phyllis Coates (born 1927), American film and television actress known for her role as Supermans Lois Lane
Ralph Coates (1946–2010), English footballer
Reginald Coates (1920–2005), British civil engineer
Richard Coates (born 1949), British professor of linguistics
Robert Coates (actor) (1772–1848), English eccentric and amateur actor
Robert M. Coates (1897–1973), American art critic and writer
Robert Coates (politician) (1928–2016), Canadian politician

S–Z

Sam Coates, British journalist
Simon Coates (disambiguation), various people
Steve Coates (born 1950), professional hockey player and hockey broadcaster
Sebastián Coates (born 1990), Uruguayan football player.
Ta-Nehisi Coates (born 1975), American author and journalist
Udolphus Aylmer Coates (1908–2000), British town planner 
Wayne Coates, former member of the Ohio House of Representatives
Wells Coates (1895–1958), Canadian architect best known for his work in England
William Coates, 1st Baronet (1866–1932), Irish stockbroker and politician
William Coates (longevity claimant), American disputed claimant to being the world's oldest person

See also
 Coats (surname)
 Coutts (surname)

References

English-language surnames
Surnames of English origin